Ritter Park Historic District is a national historic district located at Huntington, Cabell County, West Virginia. The district encompasses 68 contributing buildings and 5 contributing structures, including the Ritter Park municipal park.  The city purchased the park property in 1908.  Dwellings in the district represent the finest styles in popular architecture from the years 1913 to 1940, including Colonial Revival, Bungalow/craftsman, and Tudor Revival. Notable buildings include the Ritter Park Apartments (1932), Weingartner House (c. 1923), Cammack House (1923), Marshall University President's House (1923), and Park Terrace Apartments (c. 1939–1940).

It was listed on the National Register of Historic Places in 1990.

References

Cabell County, West Virginia
American Craftsman architecture in West Virginia
Houses in Huntington, West Virginia
Houses on the National Register of Historic Places in West Virginia
Municipal parks in West Virginia
National Register of Historic Places in Cabell County, West Virginia
Parks on the National Register of Historic Places in West Virginia
Tudor Revival architecture in West Virginia
Historic districts on the National Register of Historic Places in West Virginia